Catherine Bellis was the defending champion, but decided not to participate this year.

Ysaline Bonaventure won the title, defeating  Patty Schnyder 7–6(7–3), 6–3 in the final.

Seeds

Draw

Finals

Top half

Bottom half

References
Main Draw

Tevlin Women's Challenger
Tevlin Women's Challenger